TRST, Trst, or variations, may refer to:

 Trieste, a city in Italy
 Trst (album), stylized as TRST, the 2012 debut album for Canadian synthpop band TR/ST
 TR/ST, Canadian electropop band
 Rai Radio Trst A, aka Radio Trst, Slovene-language radio station in Trieste
 TRST (test reset), a command signal found in JTAG
 TRST (market research), Toy Retail Survey Tracking, associated with the NPD Group

See also 
 Tryst (disambiguation)
 Trust (disambiguation)
 Trist (set index)